Xicoténcatl Leyva Mortera (April 4, 1940 – September 30, 2021) was a Mexican politician, member of the Institutional Revolutionary Party, who was the Governor of Baja California from 1983 to 1989.

Xicoténcatl Leyva was related to Miguel Alemán Valdés who was the President of Mexico from 1946 to 1952. He held the positions of Assistant Secretary of Secretariat of Finance and Public Credit under Antonio Ortiz Mena, then Administrative Assistant Director of the National Institute of Youth from 1971. Then he became a delegate from the same organization to Tijuana, where he lived thereafter; there he became Undersecretary of Baja California's State Committee of the PRI and in 1978 was elected Mayor of Tijuana.
In 1983 he was nominated and elected Governor of Baja California. His government was controversial because he was accused of promoting accelerated growth without order, that made areas that were border towns into big cities without planning. In the 1988 election he was unable to avoid having to recognize the landslide victory of Cuauhtémoc Cárdenas Solórzano in the state as a candidate for the presidency against Carlos Salinas de Gortari, the PRI candidate. This may have cost him politically and make him take a leave as governor on January 5, 1989, and thereafter remain retired from politics.

References

External links
 Biography as Governor of Baja California

1940 births
2021 deaths
Governors of Baja California
Institutional Revolutionary Party politicians
Politicians from Tijuana
Municipal presidents of Tijuana
Deaths from lung cancer
20th-century Mexican politicians
Politicians from Veracruz
People from Xalapa